Yn is a letter of the old Romanian Cyrillic alphabet.

YN or Yn may also refer to:
 Yeoman (United States Navy), a rank
 Yoctonewton, a unit of force equal to 10−24 newtons
 Yottanewton, a unit of force equal to 1024 newtons
 Triple bond, in a chemical compound
 2C-YN, an analogue of the phenethylamine derived hallucinogen 2C-E
 Yes–no question
 Yunnan, a province of China (Guobiao abbreviation YN)